Saint-Médard is a commune in the Charente-Maritime department in the Nouvelle-Aquitaine region in southwestern France.

Geography
The village lies on the right bank of the Seugne, which flows northwest through the western part of the commune.

Population

See also
Communes of the Charente-Maritime department

References

Communes of Charente-Maritime
Charente-Maritime communes articles needing translation from French Wikipedia